Tripotamo ( meaning "three rivers", before 1927: Δεδέρμπεη - Dedermpei) is a village in the municipality of Megalopoli in the southwestern part of Arcadia, Greece. It is situated on the right bank of the rerouted Alfeios river, near its confluence with two smaller tributaries. It is 3 km southeast of Choremis, 3 km northeast of Neochori Lykosouras, 4 km northwest of Veligosti and 5 km southwest of Megalopoli. There is a large open-pit lignite mine to the northeast.

Historical population

See also

List of settlements in Arcadia

References

External links
Arcadia - Tripotamo(in Greek)

Megalopolis, Greece
Populated places in Arcadia, Peloponnese